This is a list of notable alumni of Mfantsipim School.

Politics
Kobina Sekyi - President, Aborigines' Rights Protection Society (ARPS), lawyer, writer, author of The Blinkards
Kofi Abrefa Busia - Prime Minister of Ghana
William Ofori Atta - Member of the Big Six
Joseph W.S. de-Graft Johnson - Vice President of Ghana (1979–1981)
Kow Nkensen Arkaah - Vice President of Ghana (1992–1996)
Kwesi Amissah-Arthur - Vice President of Ghana (2012-2017)
Albert Adu Boahen - First Presidential Candidate of the New Patriotic Party (NPP). Flagbearer in the 1992 general election
Joseph Ephraim Casely-Hayford - Lawyer and politician and member of Fante Confederacy and Aborigines' Rights Protection Society
Papa Owusu-Ankomah - Former MP for Sekondi (7 January 1997 – 6 January 2017), and Minister of State (2001–2008). 
Samuel Atta Mills - Member of parliament for the Komenda-Edina-Eguafo-Abirem Constituency (2017–)
Kwabena Agyapong - Politician, Former General Secretary of the NPP
Boakye Agyarko - Former Minister for Energy, Ghana
George Emmanuel Kwesi Aikins - Former Attorney General of Ghana
Kwabena Kwakye Anti - Minister in the second republic
Joe Appiah - politician
Albert Bosomtwi-Sam - MP for Sekondi (1992 to 1996)
Francis Yao Asare - Minister in the first republic
Kwaku Boateng - minister in the first republic
T. D. Brodie-Mends - minister in the second republic
Archie Casely-Hayford - lawyer and politician 
Isaac Chinebuah - academic and politician
Alexander Apeatu Aboagye da Costa - deputy minister in the Busia government
Alfred Jonas Dowuona-Hammond - Minister in the first republic
Kwaku Baah - Deputy Minister in the Busia government
Kwamena Bartels - Minister of state in the Kufuor government
Justice Akuamoa Boateng - deputy minister in the Busia government
Kwamena Duncan - Central Regional Minister, Akufo-Addo government
John Kofi Fynn - Deputy Minister in the Busia government
Ashford Emmanuel Inkumsah - Minister in the first republic
J. Kwesi Lamptey - minister in the second republic
Kofi Asante Ofori-Atta - politician, former Speaker of the Parliament of Ghana
J. V. L. Phillips - Minister in the NLC regime 
Augustus Obuadum Tanoh - Founding member of the National Democratic Congress, founder of the National Reform Party and presidential candidate in the 2000 Ghanaian general election 
Emmanuel Gyekye Tanoh - Minister of state in the PNDC regime

Ghanaian MPs
Joe Ghartey - lawyer, MP for Ketan-Essikado, Minister of Railways
 Edwin Nii Lante Vanderpuye - journalist, MP for Odododiodio
Anthony Seibu Alec Abban - MP for Ajumako-Asikuma and later Ajumako during the first republic
Swinthin Maxwell Arko - MP for Agona Nsaba during the first republic
Dr. Henry Satorius Bannerman - MP for Ashiedu Keteke during the second republic
Kwabena Okyere Darko-Mensah - MP for Takoradi, Deputy minister
Kobina Hagan - MP for Denkyira during the first republic

Diplomats
Kofi Annan - former UN Secretary General
Mohamed Ibn Chambas - former MP and diplomat
J. L. S. Abbey - former diplomat 
James Aggrey-Orleans - former Ghanaian envoy to the UK
Francis Lodowic Bartels - former diplomat
Ebenezer Moses Debrah - former diplomat
Patrick R. D. Hayford - former diplomat, Ghana's Ambassador to South Africa (1997–1999)
Alex Quaison-Sackey - first black president of the UN General Assembly
Nana Effah-Apenteng - former permanent representative of Ghana to the United Nations
William George Mensah Brandful - retired diplomat
Papa Owusu-Ankomah, diplomat, 2017 to date
 Miguel Augustus Francisco Ribeiro - former diplomat
 Eric Kwamina Otoo, former diplomat
 Yaw Bamful Turkson, career diplomat and Ambassador(1957-1988)

Public service
John Henry Martey Newman - Chief of staff of John Evans Atta Mills administration
Benjamin Asante - CEO, Ghana National Gas Company

Academics
James Emman Kwegyir Aggrey - Co-Founder, First Vice Principal of Achimota School
R. P. Baffour - first Vice Chancellor of KNUST
Kwame Bediako - first Rector of the Akrofi-Christaller Institute
Kwasi Kwarfo Adarkwa - former Vice Chancellor of KNUST
Daniel Afedzi Akyeampong - Ghanaian mathematician pioneer 
Joseph Wilfred Abruquah -  novelist, former headmaster of Mfantsipim School and Keta Senior High Technical School 
Samuel Otu Gyandoh - Emeritus Professor of Law
Kwame Gyekye -Philosopher
Ato Sekyi-Otu -  Academic, Writer, Political philosopher

Business, banking and finance
Ernest Addison - current Governor of the Bank of Ghana 
Kwesi Amissah-Arthur - former Governor of Bank of Ghana
G. K. Agama - former Governor of Bank of Ghana

Law
 George Emmanuel Kwesi Aikins – former Justice of the Supreme Court of Ghana and Attorney General of Ghana
 Kwadwo Agyei Agyapong – one of the three High Court judges that were abducted and murdered on June 30, 1982.
Isaac K. Amuah – Justice of the Supreme Court of Ghana (1995–1997)
Ebo Barton-Odro  – MP for Cape Coast (2008-2016), Deputy Attorney-General, and First Deputy Speaker of the Parliament of Ghana 
Kobina Arku Korsah – first Ghanaian Chief Justice of Ghana
Edmund Alexander Lanquaye Bannerman – 4th Chief Justice of Ghana
 Isaac Kobina Abban – 9th Chief Justice of Ghana and former Chief Justice of Seychelles
 Benjamin Teiko Aryeetey – Justice of the Supreme Court of Ghana (2009–2011)
 Theodore Kwami Adzoe – Justice of the Supreme Court of Ghana (2000–2008) 
William Bruce-Lyle – Supreme Court Judge of Ghana and Zambia
John Mensah Sarbah – lawyer and academic
Kurankyi-Taylor
Joe Ghartey – former Attorney General of Ghana
J. E. Casely Hayford – lawyer and academician
William Bedford Van Lare – former justice of the Supreme Court of Ghana
Samuel Okai Quashie-Idun – former puisne judge of the Supreme Court of Ghana, former Chief Justice of the High Court of Western Nigeria and former President of the Court of Appeal for Eastern Africa
Papa Owusu-Ankomah – Attorney General of Ghana (2003–2004)
Emmanuel Gyekye Tanoh – Attorney General of Ghana (1988–1993)
Tsatsu Tsikata  – lawyer and academic
Isaac Wuaku – retired justice of the Supreme Court of Ghana

Military and law enforcement
Matthew Quashie - former Chief of Defence Staff of the Ghana Armed Forces
Erasmus Ransford Tawiah Madjitey - first Ghanaian Commissioner of the Ghana Police Service

Medicine
Henry Satorius Bannerman - Formerly president of the Ghana Medical Association and the Commonwealth Medical Association
David Ofori-Adjei  - professor of Clinical Pharmacology 
Oku Ampofo - medical practitioner and sculptor 
Raphael Armattoe - medical researcher

Journalism
Berifi Afari Apenteng - Director General of the Ghana Broadcasting Corporation (2011–2013)
Anis Haffar - educationist, teacher, columnist and author
Edwin Nii Lante Vanderpuye - journalist, MP for Ododiodio, former Minister of Sports

Entrepreneurs
Kofi Amoa-Abban - Founder of Rigworld
Herman Chinery-Hesse - Founder of SOFTtribe, the largest software company in Ghana 
Isaac Sesi - Entrepreneur, Engineer, and Founder of Sesi Technologies
Edward Annan - Co-owner and Co-founder of Ghanaian domestic airline, Passion Air and Founder of Masai Motors Limited
Kwasi Twum - Owner and CEO of The Multimedia Group, Ghana's largest independent commercial media group

Film, theater, modelling and television

Van Vicker - actor
Majid Michel - actor
Michael Dei-Anang - playwright, poet and novelist
Kweku Elliot - actor
Nii Kwate Owoo - filmmaker
Joe de Graft - playwright
Brew Riverson Jnr - actor
Aaron Adatsi - actor

Religion
Kwame Bediako - Christian theologian
Michael A. Bossman
Kwesi Dickson

Athletics and sports 
Derek Boateng - former black stars player
Arthur Wharton- first black professional footballer in the world
Kweku Eyiah - lawyer and football administrator
Aziz Zakari - former Ghana sprinter

References

 
Lists of Ghanaian people by school affiliation